Qais Abdur Rashīd or Qais Abdul Rasheed is said to be, in post-Islamic lore, the legendary founding father of the Pashtuns.  It is believed that the conception of such a figure was promoted to bring harmony between religious and ethnic identities post-Arabic influence over the region.  Qais Abdur Rashid is said to have traveled to Mecca and Medina in Arabia during the early days of Islam and converted. But contrary to this legend, Islam spread through Afghanistan over a period of time.

Genealogical tree
Some Afghan genealogists list Qais Abdur Rashid as the 37th descendant of King Talut (or Saul, reigned c. 1050 BC–1010 BC) through Malak Afghana, a legendary grandson of Talut.

According to the Encyclopaedia of Islam, the theory of Pashtun descent from the ancient Israelites is traced to Tārīkh-e Khān Jahānī wa Makhzan-e Afghānī, a history compiled by Nimat Allah al-Harawi during the reign of the Mughal emperor Jahangir in the 17th century.

Legend
Legend has it that Qais was born in the Ghor region of present-day central Afghanistan. Upon hearing about the advent of Islam, his tribe sent him to Medina in the Arabian Peninsula, in present-day Saudi Arabia. He met Muhammad and embraced Islam there, and was given the name Abdur Rashīd by Muhammad. He then returned to Ghor and introduced Islam to his tribe. According to Mountstuart Elphinstone, in legend the famous military leader and companion of Muhammad, Khalid ibn al-Walid, introduced Qais to Muhammad. According to the folk tale, Qais had three sons: Saṛban, Bēṭ, and Gharghax̌t. His sons founded three tribal confederacies named after them: Sarbani, Bettani, and Gharghashti. Qais also had an adopted son, Karlani Ormur, who is progenitor of the Karlani tribe. There are multiple versions of the legend, including several regional variants that mention only one, two, or three of the four legendary brothers.

Settlement
One legend has it that when Qais felt his time was near, he asked his sons to take him from Ghor to the Sulaiman Mountains and bury him at the spot where his ancestor Malak Afghana was buried, and he was buried on top of Takht-e-Sulaiman ("Throne of Solomon"), also called Da Kasī Ghar ("Mount of Qais"), located near the village of Darazinda in Frontier Region Dera Ismail Khan of the FATA Districts of Pakistan, close to Frontier Region Dera Ismail Khan's borders with both South Waziristan and Zhob District, Balochistan. Some people visit the place, mostly in the summer, since in winters the snowfall makes it difficult to climb, and sacrifice an animal, usually a sheep or a goat at the tomb of Qais.

According to another legend, however, Qais settled in the Balkh region of present-day northern Afghanistan. From there, his different descendants migrated south, west, and east.

See also
Amir Kror Suri, a legendary 8th-century Pashtun prince from Ghor
Amir Suri, a pagan Ghorid king in the 9th and 10th century who was defeated in war with the Saffarid emir Ya'qub ibn al-Layth al-Saffar
Lech, Czech, and Rus, three legendary brothers who are said to have founded the three modern Slavic nations of Poles (or Lechites), Czechs, and Rus' (or Russians, Ukrainians, and Belarusians)
Fénius Farsaid, a legendary Scythian prince who is said to have founded the modern Irish nation and invented the Ogham Irish alphabet
Asena, a she-wolf in the mythical foundation of the Göktürks
Hayk, legendary father of the Armenians

References

Pashtun people
Converts to Islam from Judaism
Legendary progenitors
575 births
661 deaths
Companions of the Prophet